Kinneret is the name of an important Bronze and Iron Age city situated on the northwestern shore of the Sea of Galilee, mentioned in the 14th century BC Aqhat Epic of Ugarit, and in the Old Testament and New Testament. Older Bible translations spell the name alternatively Kinnereth or Chinnereth, and sometimes in the plural as Chinneroth. In time the name became Gennesaret and Ginosar. The remains of Kinneret have been excavated at a site called Tell el-'Oreimeh (Tell el-‘Orēme) in Arabic and Tel Kinrot in Modern Hebrew.

Etymology

"Kinneret"

Talmud
According to the Jerusalem Talmud (Megillah 1:1), the name Kinneret is derived from the name of the kinnar trees which grow in its vicinity, explained by lexicographer M. Jastrow to mean the Christ's thorn jujube (Ziziphus spina-christi), and by Moses Margolies to mean cane reeds.

Another Talmud passage says that it is so-called because its fruits are as sweet as those of the kinnara (Ziziphus spina-christi).

"Gennesaret" and "Ginosar"

The late-19th-century Easton's Bible Dictionary offers a very different etymology, by stating that the initial Hebrew name 'Kinneret', in the plural 'Kinnerot', was Grecized to Gennesaret, with Ginosar as yet another transformation of the Hebrew name.

Historical use of the name

The lake
Due to its prominence, the city gave its name to the lake (the "Sea of Galilee") for long periods of history, as the Sea of Kinneret, Kinnerot, Gennesaret, or Ginosar.

As other places around the lake rose to prominence, such as Tiberias and Qasr al-Minya, the name of the lake also changed to Lake Tiberias or Lake Minya ("Bahr el-Minya").

The plain
The name has also been used for the "Plain of Gennesaret", which stretches south of the ancient city. The plain's modern names are Plain of Ginosar in Hebrew and el-Ghuweir in Arabic.

Modern settlements
The Israeli kibbutz Ginosar derives its name from the ancient town, though it is not located on its precise site. The settlements of Moshavat Kinneret and Kvutzat Kinneret are even further south, on the southwestern shore of the lake.

Biblical and other ancient sources

Annals of Thutmose III

Kinneret is mentioned as Kennartou in the 15th-century BCE Annals of Thutmose III at Temple of Karnak.

Hebrew Bible
Kinneret was a town allotted to the tribe of Naphtali. The name appears in the singular form as "Kinneret" or in the plural as "Kinneroth".

New Testament Gospels
In the New Testament the name appears changed to Gennesaret.

This city or area is also a place where Jesus visited and performed healing. The Douay-Rheims Bible uses the form "Genesar", see Gospel of Matthew
[34] And having passed the water, they came into the country of Genesar. (Matthew 14:34).

Josephus and Babylonian Talmud
Flavius Josephus, as well as the Babylonian Talmud mention the lake by the name "Sea of Ginosar" after the small fertile plain of Ginosar that lies at the foot of Tell el-'Oreimeh, ancient Kinneret. Josephus refers to the area as having very rich soil.

Identification and location

The site of the fortified Bronze and Iron Age city of Kinneret is identified with the mound known in Arabic as Tell el-'Oreimeh and in modern Hebrew as Tel Kinrot, halfway between Capernaum and Magdala. Situated on an important trade route, its elevated position meant that it also overlooked and guarded the Plain of Ginosar from its northern end.

The site has the ICS Coordinates: 200805-1252830; ca. 32.87000 N, 35.539312 E.

Archaeological exploration
The tell is being excavated as part of a large archaeological project which is ongoing since 2002.

See also
Cities in the Book of Joshua

References

Easton's Bible Dictionary (1897)
Catholic Encyclopedia

External links

Tel Kinrot page on the website of the "Kinneret Regional Project" international archaeological expedition

archaeological sites in Israel
New Testament places
Hebrew Bible places
Former populated places in Southwest Asia
Tells (archaeology)
Sea of Galilee